Merchant of Love (French: Marchand d'amour) is a 1935 French comedy film directed by Edmond T. Gréville and starring Jean Galland, Rosine Deréan and Françoise Rosay.

The film's sets were designed by the art director Pierre Schild.

Cast
 Jean Galland as Jack Stephen 
 Rosine Deréan as Lily 
 Jacqueline Daix as Mitzi 
 Robert Arnoux as Léo 
 Françoise Rosay as Clara 
 Paul Ollivier as Le commanditaire 
 Maurice Maillot as Le jeune premier 
 Félix Oudart as Le producteur 
 Georges Bever
 Nane Germon
 Enrico Glori
 Fred Marche
 Viviane Romance

Reception
Writing for The Spectator in 1936, Graham Greene gave the film a mildly positive review, characterizing it as "a melodramatic and rather silly tale [...] directed with immense panache and a secret sense of amusement".

References

Bibliography 
 Lucy Mazdon & Catherine Wheatley. Je T’Aime... Moi Non Plus: Franco-British Cinematic Relations. Berghahn Books, 2010.

External links 
 

1935 films
French comedy films
1935 comedy films
1930s French-language films
Films directed by Edmond T. Gréville
Pathé films
French black-and-white films
1930s French films